Križ Hrastovački is a village in Petrinja municipality in Sisak-Moslavina County, Croatia.

References

Populated places in Sisak-Moslavina County